Kingsmuir railway station served the village of Kingsmuir, Angus, Scotland, from 1870 to 1955 on the Dundee and Forfar direct line.

History 
The station was opened on 14 November 1870 by the Caledonian Railway. To the south was the goods yard. It had a siding on the east side of the line and a signal box, which closed in 1932. The station closed on 10 January 1955.

References 

Disused railway stations in Angus, Scotland
Former Caledonian Railway stations
Railway stations in Great Britain opened in 1870
Railway stations in Great Britain closed in 1955
1870 establishments in Scotland
1955 disestablishments in Scotland